James Garner (1928–2014) was an American film and television star.

James or Jim Garner may also refer to:

James Garner (footballer, born 1895) (1895–1975), English footballer
James Garner (footballer, born 2001), English footballer
James Garner (cricketer) (born 1972), English cricketer
James Garner (politician), 1988–2005 mayor of Hempstead, New York
James Bert Garner (1870–1960), American chemist, and inventor of the gas mask
James Finn Garner (born 1961), American comedy writer
James Wilford Garner (1871–1938), American political writer
James E. Garner, Sr., mayor of New Albany, Indiana
James William Arthur Garner (born 1944), politician in Saskatchewan, Canada
Jay Garner (born 1938), American military officer
Jay Garner (actor) (1929–2011; born James Garner), American actor
Jim Garner (American football), American football player (1949–1951) and coach (1960–1966) for Livingston State College
Jim Garner (American politician) (born 1963), American politician and former Kansas Secretary of Labor
Jim Garner (athletic director), American college athletics administrator

See also
James Gardner (disambiguation)